In Times of Trouble is a studio album released in 1983 by the Washington, D.C.-based go-go band Trouble Funk.

Track listing

Side A
"Spintime" – 4:50
"In Times of Trouble" – 5:23
"Share Your Love" – 5:07
"Good Times" – 4:29

Side B
"Say What" – 5:21
"Freaky Situation" – 4:08
"Funk N Roll" – 4:09
"Good Times" – 4:29

Personnel
 Robert "Dyke" Reed – electric guitar, keyboards, vocals
 Tony Fisher – lead vocals, bass guitar
 James Avery –  keyboards, vocals
 Taylor Reed – trumpet, vocals
 Timothy "T-Bone" David – percussions, vocals
 MacCarey – drums, percussions
 Alonzo Robinson – percussions, vocals
 Dave Rudd – saxophone, vocal
 Dean Harris – trumpet, vocals
 Chester Davis – electric guitar

References

External links
 In Times of Trouble at Discogs

1983 albums
Trouble Funk albums